Lakshmia hauensteini is a species of moth of the family Cossidae. It is found in northern Thailand.

References

Moths described in 2004
Zeuzerinae